Maung Zarni (born 1963) is a Burmese educator, academic, and human rights activist. He is noted for his opposition to the violence in Rakhine State and Rohingya refugee crisis.

Early life and education
Zarni was born in 1963 into a Burmese Buddhist family in Mandalay, Burma. He migrated to the United States on the eve of Burma’s 1988 uprisings. He graduated with a BSc (Chemistry) from University of Mandalay in 1984, MA from University of California, Davis in 1991, and earned his PhD in Curriculum and Instruction from University of Wisconsin-Madison in 1998.

Career
Zarni founded and led the Free Burma Coalition, the then pioneering Internet-based human rights movement and spearheaded a successful international boycott against Myanmar’s military dictatorship from 1995 to 2004. Zarni has held a series of academic positions, or research and leadership fellowships, including at the London School of Economics' Human Security Research Unit. He resigned from an academic post at the Universiti Brunei Darussalam in 2013, citing academic censorship.

Zarni is a member of the board of advisors of Genocide Watch and a non-resident fellow at Genocide Documentation Center in Sleuk Rith Institute, Cambodia.

In 2014, Zarni co-authored an academic paper, "The Slow Burning Genocide of Myanmar's Rohingyas", with Alice Cowley, an academic study that examines the plight of the Rohingya using the genocide framework. In 2015, he was awarded the "Cultivation of Harmony Award," by the Parliament of the World's Religions, an international interfaith dialogue.

Personal life
Zarni is married to Natalie Brinham, an English researcher, and has a daughter, Nilah.

Books
Myanmar’s Enemy of the State speaks: Irreverent Essays and Interviews (2019)
Essays on Myanmar's Genocide of Rohingyas (2011-18) (2018)
The Free Burma Coalition Manual: How You Can Help Burma's Struggle for Freedom (1997)

References

External links

Living people
1963 births
People from Mandalay
Burmese Buddhists
Burmese academics
Burmese expatriates in the United States
Burmese expatriates in Malaysia
Burmese expatriates in the United Kingdom
Burmese human rights activists
Burmese democracy activists
University of California, Davis alumni
Mandalay University alumni
Academic staff of Universiti Brunei Darussalam